Nikolay Yakovlevich Sonin (Russian: Никола́й Я́ковлевич Со́нин, February 22, 1849 – February 27, 1915) was a Russian mathematician.

Biography 
He was born in Tula and attended Lomonosov University, studying mathematics and physics there from 1865 to 1869.  His advisor was Nikolai Bugaev.  He obtained a master's degree with a thesis submitted in 1871, then he taught at the University of Warsaw where he obtained a doctorate in 1874. He was appointed to a chair in the University of Warsaw in 1876. In 1894, Sonin moved to St. Petersburg, where he taught at the University for Women.

Sonin worked on special functions, in particular cylindrical functions. For instance, the Sonine formula is a formula given by Sonin for the integral of the product of three Bessel functions. He is furthermore credited with the introduction  of the associated Laguerre polynomials.  He also contributed to the Euler–Maclaurin summation formula.

Other topics Sonin studied include Bernoulli polynomials and approximate computation of definite integrals, continuing Chebyshev's work on numerical integration.  Together with  Andrey Markov, Sonin prepared a two volume edition of Chebyshev's works in French and Russian. He died in St. Petersburg.

References

External links 
 

1849 births
1915 deaths
Moscow State University alumni
University of Warsaw alumni
Academic staff of the University of Warsaw
Mathematical analysts
19th-century mathematicians from the Russian Empire
20th-century Russian mathematicians